Maud Carnegie, Countess of Southesk (née Lady Maud Duff; 3 April 1893 – 14 December 1945), titled Princess Maud from 1905 to 1923, was a granddaughter of Edward VII. Maud and her elder sister, Alexandra, had the distinction of being the only female-line descendants of a British sovereign officially granted both the title of Princess and the style of Highness.

Although Princess Maud did not otherwise carry out royal engagements, because of her position in the Commonwealth's order of succession she served as a Counsellor of State between 1942 and 1945.

Early life
Maud was born at East Sheen Lodge, Richmond-upon-Thames, Surrey, on 3 April 1893. Her father was Alexander Duff, 1st Duke of Fife. He was raised from Earl to  Duke of Fife following marriage to Maud's mother, Princess Louise of Wales, the third child and eldest daughter of the future King Edward VII and Queen Alexandra.

Maud was christened on 22 June 1893 in the Chapel Royal of St James's Palace.

Maud and her sister were unique in sharing descent from both William IV (through his mistress, Dorothea Jordan), and William IV's niece, Queen Victoria, who succeeded him because he left no legitimate issue.

Princess

In 1900, Queen Victoria granted Maud's father a second dukedom of Fife in the peerage of the United Kingdom with a special remainder providing for the succession of the duke's daughters and their male-line descendants to the title, in default of a male heir. Maud became second in line to the dukedom, after her elder sister Alexandra, and her descendants would eventually succeed to the peerage.

As a cognatic great-granddaughter of a British monarch (Queen Victoria), Maud was not entitled to the title of a Princess of the United Kingdom of Great Britain and Ireland nor to the attribute Royal Highness. Instead she was styled Lady Maud Duff, as the daughter of a duke. She was sixth in the line of succession to the British throne at the time of her birth.

On 9 November 1905, King Edward VII gave (on the occasion of his birthday) Maud's mother the title of Princess Royal. He further ordered Garter King of Arms to gazette Maud and her sister with the style and attribute of Highness and the style of Princess prefixed to their respective Christian names, with precedence immediately after all members of the British royal family bearing the style of Royal Highness.

She took part in the carriage procession for members of the royal family when she attended the state funeral of Edward VII in 1910 (she was styled in the London Gazette as "Her Highness Princess Maud" and her sister "Her Highness Princess Alexandra", both without the territorial designation "of Fife"). She attended the coronation of her uncle, George V, on 22 June 1911 with the royal family, styled as "Her Highness Princess Maud" (without territorial designation).

Maud's uncle, King George V, in letters patent dated 20 November 1917, restructured the styles and titles of the royal family by restricting the titles of Prince or Princess and the style of Royal Highness to the children of the sovereign, the children of the sovereign's sons, and the eldest living son of the eldest son of the Prince of Wales. The Letters Patent also stated that "the titles of Royal Highness, Highness or Serene Highness, and the titular dignity of Prince and Princess shall cease except those titles already granted and remaining unrevoked". This had no direct effect on Maud and her sister, whose rank and style derived from the specific promotions granted to them by their grandfather, Edward VII, and George V took no further action to retract the royal warrant conferring the princely title and attribute upon them. Maud therefore continued to use her princely title until her 1923 marriage. Upon her marriage to Charles, Lord Carnegie, however, she chose to be known as Lady Maud Carnegie (or, from 1941, the Countess of Southesk), dropping her princely title.

She rode in the carriage procession with members of the royal family at the funeral of George V in 1936; on this occasion she was styled in the London Gazette as "Lady Maud Carnegie". She also attended the coronation of her first cousin, King George VI in May 1937, taking part in the procession of members of the royal family, and was officially styled as Lady Maud Carnegie.

Marriage
On 13 November 1923, Maud married Charles, Lord Carnegie (23 September 1893 – 16 February 1992) at the Royal Military Chapel, Wellington Barracks, London. Lord Carnegie was the eldest son of Charles Noel Carnegie, 10th Earl of Southesk and inherited the title of Earl of Southesk on his father's death on 10 November 1941.

Maud and her husband operated a model farm from Elsick House, in Kincardineshire, Scotland. They had one child, James (23 September 1929 - 22 June 2015).

Girl Guides
Maud was a devoted supporter of the Girl Guides movement. She was a County Commissioner in Angus and Aberdeenshire and a member of the Executive Committee in Scotland. She was a recipient of the Silver Fish Award, Girl Guiding's highest adult honour, in 1937.

Later life

Princess Maud consistently appeared at the Court of St. James's among the royal family, although she did not undertake official or public duties. During George VI's absence in Africa in 1943, Maud served as a Counsellor of State. At the time of her death in 1945, she was thirteenth in line to the British throne and heir presumptive to the dukedom of Fife, since her sister's only son Alastair Windsor, 2nd Duke of Connaught and Strathearn, had died in 1943. Maud's only son James, Lord Carnegie, succeeded his aunt as 3rd Duke of Fife in 1959. He succeeded to his father's titles in 1992.

Princess Maud died in a London nursing home on 14 December 1945 after a bout of acute bronchitis. Her will was sealed in Llandudno in 1946. Her estate was valued at £44,008 (or £1.2 million in 2022 when adjusted for inflation).

Ancestry

References and notes

1893 births
1945 deaths
People from East Sheen
People from Richmond, London
British princesses
Southesk
Daughters of British dukes
Edwardian era
Deaths from bronchitis
Infectious disease deaths in England
Recipients of the Silver Fish Award
Wives of knights
Non-inheriting heirs presumptive